The 1941–42 season was Stoke City's seventh season in the non-competitive War League.

In 1939 World War II was declared and the Football League was cancelled. In its place were formed War Leagues and cups, based on geographical lines rather than based on previous league placement. However, none of these were considered to be competitive football, and thus their records are not recognised by the Football League and thus not included in official records.

Season review
There were three separate competitions in the 1941–42 season, two series of Football League North and a Football League War Cup tournament. Stoke did well without pulling up too many trees, finishing 5th in the first phase of the league and then a rather poor 16th in the second. Attendances were quite small due to obvious restrictions imposed by the authorities but the entertainment value was high with goals in abundance, both home and away. Among the many impressive scorelines for Stoke were those of 8–3 v Everton, 7–1 v Wrexham, 9–0 & 7–2 v Tranmere Rovers and a 10–0 defeat by Northampton Town in late May. That heavy reverse against the "Cobblers" was unbelievable as Stoke fielded a strong line up. Tommy Sale was in incredible goalscoring form this season hitting 56 goals including eleven hat-tricks.

Results

Stoke's score comes first

Legend

Football League North 1st Phase

Football League North 2nd Phase

Football League War Cup

Squad statistics

References

Stoke City F.C. seasons
Stoke City